His Majesty's Military Staff is the military staff of the Swedish monarch and functions as a unit of the Royal Court. It is led by the chief of staff and supports the King and the Royal Family at official ceremonies, military exercises and representations. The chief of staff also participates in state visits. The staff belongs to the Swedish Armed Forces and is subordinate to the King directly. The chief of staff shall also assist the King with an on duty aide-de-camp. The King and the Crown Princess have twelve aides-de-camp each and they serve a month a year as on duty aides-de-camp. Their guard list is determined by the chief of staff. Prince Carl Philip has two aides-de-camp. These support the Prince during the year at the times when he has official missions and requests an aide-de-camp. Since 1 October 2018, Lieutenant General Jan Salestrand serves as chief of staff.


Uniform
The chief of staff wears a large aiguillette m/1816 and guard stick m/1793. The stick is provided with a twist of black silk with two black tassels. An officer in the staff carries the king's name cipher of gold-colored metal.

Chiefs of Staff
The head of the staff in called either First Aide-de-Camp and Chief of the King's Staff or Chief Principal Aide-de-Camp to the King.

During the reign of Oscar II
1872–1905: General Sven Lagerberg
1905–1907: General Hemming Gadd

During the reign of Gustaf V
1908–1909: Major General Carl Rosenblad (acting)
1909–1910: Lieutenant General Carl Warberg
1910–1923: Lieutenant General Gustaf Uggla
1924–1944: Admiral Carl August Ehrensvärd
1944–1950: General Olof Thörnell

During the reign of Gustaf VI Adolf
1950–1963: Lieutenant General Hugo Cederschiöld
1963–1969: General Thord Bonde
1969–1973: Lieutenant General Gustav Åkerman

During the reign of Carl XVI Gustaf
1973–1978: Lieutenant General Malcolm Murray
1978–1986: General Stig Synnergren
1986–1990: General Lennart Ljung
1990–1997: Admiral Bror Stefenson
1997–2003: Lieutenant General Curt Sjöö
2003–2007: Vice Admiral Frank Rosenius
2007–2018: Major General Håkan Pettersson
2018—present: Lieutenant General Jan Salestrand

Footnotes

See also
 Commandant General in Stockholm
 Military Cabinet (Prussia)

References

External links
Official site 

Swedish monarchy
Military of Sweden
Sweden